Municipal elections were held in Bolivia in 1991.

Results

References

Local elections in Bolivia
Bolivia
1991 in Bolivia